Subtext is a blog publishing system written in C# on ASP.NET. All data is stored in a Microsoft SQL Server database.

The latest release of Subtext is 2.5, released on June 6, 2010. It is distributed under the BSD License.

Features
 XHTML and CSS compliant
 Search engine-friendly permalink structure via friendly URLs
 TrackBack and Pingback
 Hosts multiple blogs on a single installation
 MetaWeblog API support
 Skinnable
 Really Simple Discovery
 BlogML support
 OpenID support
 Tag support

History
Subtext was announced on May 4, 2005, but the first release (Subtext Nautilus Edition) wasn't announced until March 2, 2006.

Subtext was founded as a fork of the BSD Licensed .Text blogging engine written by Scott Watermasysk. .Text went on to be packaged within the Telligent Community product (formerly known as Community Server by Telligent Systems. Subtext is the blog engine used by MySpace for its Chinese site.

Subtext is hosted on Google Code and is led by Phil Haack.

Releases
 Subtext 1.0 - March 4, 2006
 Subtext 1.5 - June 7, 2006
 Subtext 1.9 - August 31, 2006
 Subtext 1.9.2 - October 26, 2006
 Subtext 1.9.3 - December 14, 2006
 Subtext 1.9.4 - February 12, 2007
 Subtext 1.9.5 - May 12, 2007
 Subtext 2.0.0 - August 10, 2008
 Subtext 2.1 - November 27, 2008
 Subtext 2.1.2 - July 29, 2009
 Subtext 2.5.0 - June 6, 2010

See also

 Blog software
 Blog

References

External links
 SubtextProject.com - Official Subtext Project Website

Blog software
Internet services supporting OpenID
Content management systems
Website management
Software using the BSD license